Luke Witkowski (born April 14, 1990) is an American professional ice hockey player who is currently playing for the Springfield Thunderbirds in the American Hockey League (AHL) while under contract to the St. Louis Blues in the National Hockey League (NHL). He has also previously played in the NHL for the Tampa Bay Lightning and the Detroit Red Wings. Witkowski was selected by the Lightning, 160th overall, in the 2008 NHL Entry Draft.

Playing career

Juniors
Witkowski was selected by the Texas Tornado in the 2007 NAHL Draft, but played in the United States Hockey League for the Fargo Force. He was drafted by the Tampa Bay Lightning in the 2008 NHL Entry Draft. Witkowski played collegiate hockey for the Western Michigan Broncos. As captain at WMU his senior year, he was named Second Team ALL-CCHA with two goals and 10 points. Witkowski played in 152 games over four years at WMU. On April 1, 2013, the Tampa Bay Lightning announced the signing of Witkowski to a two-year entry level contract.

Professional

Tampa Bay Lightning
On October 19, 2014, the Tampa Bay Lightning recalled Witkowski from the Syracuse Crunch. He has played in four games for the Crunch prior to the recall, recording an assist and 15 penalty minutes. In his first professional season, he appeared in 76 games with the Crunch. During the 2013-14 season, he recorded two goals and 12 points with 204 penalty minutes. During the preseason with the Lightning, he had an assist and 11 penalty minutes. On October 23, 2014, the Lightning reassigned Witkowski back to the Crunch. During his brief stint with the Lightning, he did not appear in any games with the team.

On January 16, 2015, the Lightning recalled Witkowski from the Syracuse Crunch. He had appeared in 36 games with the Crunch at that point during the season, posting a goal and six points to go along with 75 penalty minutes. On January 20, 2015, Witkowski made his NHL debut in a Tampa Bay Lightning 4-1 victory over the visiting Vancouver Canucks. In his NHL debut, Witkowski had 14:29 in ice time on the night. On April 14, 2014, the Tampa Bay Lightning announced that Witkowsi had been reassigned to the Syracuse Crunch. He was expected to help them finish out the regular season and during their playoff run. Witkowski played in 16 games in two stints with the Lightning during the 2014–15 NHL season, where his physical brand of hockey helped the team through a series of injuries on defense. In the season finale, Witkowski had a team high eight hits in a Lightning 3-2 shootout win over the Boston Bruins.

On July 17, 2015, the Lightning announced the re-signing of Witkowski to a one-year, two-way contract. Witkowski played in 16 games with the Lightning during the 2014-2015 season, recording 15 penalty minutes. He had 37 hits and blocked 20 shots during his sixteen-game stint with the team. Witkowski skated in 50 games with the Crunch last season, collecting two goals and eight points along with 91 penalty minutes. He also skated in three Calder Cup Playoff games with Syracuse in 2015, posting one assist and four penalty minutes.

On May 6, 2016, Wikowski played in his first career NHL playoff game, which was a 2-1 Lightning win over the New York Islanders. On June 24, 2016, the Lightning re-signed Witkowski to a one-year, two-way contract. During the 2016 season, Witkowski played in 4 regular season games with the team. Witkowski also made his Stanley Cup Playoff debut, where he appeared in two games during the second round against the New York Islanders. Witkowski has played in 20 career NHL games, all with the Lightning over the past two seasons. He has also played in 199 career games in the AHL, all with the Crunch.

On October 20, 2016, Witkowski was named as the captain of the Syracuse Crunch. Witkowski was the 15th full-time captain in team history and only the second in the Crunch's five seasons of affiliation with the Lightning. Witkowski would start his fourth full season with the Crunch, and had previously been a captain for two years at Western Michigan and one with Fargo of the USHL. On December 8, 2016, Witkowski recorded his first career NHL assist and point. During the 2016–17 season, Witkowski played a career-high 34 NHL games for the Lightning, recording four assists, 24 shots on goal, 81 hits and 21 blocked shots.

Detroit Red Wings
On July 1, 2017, Witkowski signed a two-year contract with the Detroit Red Wings.

On November 15, 2017, Witkowski was suspended ten games by the NHL for returning to the ice to take part in an altercation after being escorted off by an official. On February 17, 2018, Witkowski scored his first career NHL goal against Juuse Saros of the Nashville Predators.

Return to Tampa
On July 1, 2019, having left the Red Wings as a free agent, Witkowski returned to his former club, the Tampa Bay Lightning in signing a two-year, two-way contract. He was named Crunch captain for the second time on December 5, 2019. Witkowski was one of the eight players called up to the Lightning for their training camp prior to the 2020 Stanley Cup Playoffs.

Witkowski spent the entirety of the 2020–21 season in the AHL with Syracuse before suffering a season ending shoulder injury.

Return to Detroit
On July 29, 2021, Witkowski returned for a second stint with the Detroit Red Wings, agreeing to a two-year, two-way contract.

St. Louis Blues
On March 21, 2022, he was traded to the St. Louis Blues, along with Nick Leddy, in exchange for Oskar Sundqvist, Jake Walman and a second-round pick in 2023 NHL Entry Draft.

Career statistics

References

External links

1990 births
American men's ice hockey defensemen
American men's ice hockey right wingers
American people of Polish descent
Detroit Red Wings players
Fargo Force players
Grand Rapids Griffins players
Ice hockey players from Michigan
Living people
Ohio Junior Blue Jackets players
People from Holland, Michigan
Springfield Thunderbirds players
Syracuse Crunch players
Tampa Bay Lightning draft picks
Tampa Bay Lightning players
Western Michigan Broncos men's ice hockey players